Jiaocheng is a county of central Shanxi province, China. It is under the administration of Lüliang city.

Climate

Notable people from Jiaocheng

 Hua Guofeng
 Wu Rongrong

References

External links
www.xzqh.org 

County-level divisions of Shanxi
Lüliang